Ahmosia is a genus of moths belonging to the subfamily Olethreutinae of the family Tortricidae.

Species
Ahmosia aspasiana (McDunnough, 1922)
Ahmosia galbinea Heinrich, 1926

See also
List of Tortricidae genera

References

External links
tortricidae.com

Tortricidae genera
Olethreutinae